Viktor Mineyev (19 June 1937 – 22 July 2002) is a former Soviet modern pentathlete and Olympic Champion. He competed at the 1964 Summer Olympics in Tokyo, where he won a gold medal in the team competition (together with Igor Novikov and Albert Mokeyev), and placed fifth in the individual competition.
Is the first sportsman in history of Republic Azerbaijan won a gold Olympic medal (1964 Olympic Games of Tokyo).

References

1937 births
2002 deaths
Russian male modern pentathletes
Soviet male modern pentathletes
Olympic modern pentathletes of the Soviet Union
Modern pentathletes at the 1964 Summer Olympics
Olympic gold medalists for the Soviet Union
Olympic medalists in modern pentathlon
Medalists at the 1964 Summer Olympics
World Modern Pentathlon Championships medalists